Michael Laucke (born 29 January1947) is a Canadian classical, new flamenco, and flamenco guitarist, and a music industry entrepreneur. This page is dedicated to CDs, films and atonal works written for, dedicated to and recorded by Laucke.

Laucke has broadened the repertoire of the guitar with over 100transcriptions and twenty-five Canadian composers have written atonal works for him, including a flamenco concierto for guitar with full symphonic orchestra. He has recorded sixteen albums and appeared in six films. His albums have won the Grand Prix du Disque for Best Canadian Recording, the Jules Léger Prize for New Chamber Music and his album Jade Eyes, for CBS records, was reviewed by Guitar and Lute magazine (Hawaii) as the best international classical guitar album of the year. He also created an instructional video series.

Laucke performed in the first IMAX HD film in 48 frames per second, a Super IMAX film called Momentum, produced by the National Film Board of Canada and co-directed by Colin Low. Its premiere took place in the Canadian pavilion during the Universal Exposition of Seville (Expo '92)a world's fair. Laucke's CD Flamenco Road reached number one on video charts across Canada for five consecutive weeks. SOCAN's The Music Scene magazine considered Laucke to be one of "five of Canada's best-known soloists". Music critic emeritus, historian, and musician Eric McLean of the Montreal Gazette avowed, "Laucke is the person who has done more for the guitar in this country than anyone else." After 50 years of concert performances, Laucke continues an active career. In 2015, Laucke was nominated for the Order of CanadaLifetime Achievement Award, which is his country's second-highest civilian honour.

Discography and filmography

CD

LP

Filmography

Atonal works written for Laucke 

The following works have been performed by Laucke in Carnegie Hall (performing Jean Papineau-Couture), Wigmore Hall (Michel-Georges Brégent), and National Gallery of Art (Michel Gonneville). In Canada, the SMCQ honoured Laucke's contribution by featuring him in a two-hour-long concert.

Legend:
 RCI means Radio Canada International label
 MUR means McGill University label
 CBC means CBC recording in studio or in concert
 Date means date of record or CBC recording.

See also 

 List of classical guitarists
 List of flamenco guitarists

References

External links 

 Official website (in English and French versions)
 Intermede Music
 YouTube Chanel

Classical music discographies
Compositions for guitar
Contemporary classical music
Flamenco discographies
New flamenco
Media containing Gymnopedies